Sean Young (born April 20, 2001) is a Canadian professional soccer player who plays as a midfielder for Pacific FC.

Early life
Young played youth soccer with Bays United FC, later joining the Vancouver Island Wave, winning the U16 provincial title with the team in 2017. In 2018, he played with the Victoria Highlanders reserves in the Pacific Coast Soccer League, scoring one goal and helping them finish second in the division. During the 2018-19 season, he played at the senior amateur level with Westcastle United in the Vancouver Island Soccer League, helping them win the 2019 Jackson Cup, for the club's first ever championship.

Club career
In April 2019, he signed with Victoria Highlanders FC first team in USL League Two. He made twelve appearances that season and scored a goal against Portland Timbers U23s on May 19, 2019.

In July 2020, after training with the club since June, he signed a professional contract with Pacific FC of the Canadian Premier League, becoming the first local player to sign a contract with the club. He made his porfessional debut on August 18, 2020, in a substitute appearance against York9. After the season, he extended his contract for the 2021 season. He scored his first professional goal on October 21, 2021, against Cavalry FC. After winning the league title with Pacific in 2021, he extended his contract once again for the 2022 season. In November 2022, he once again extended his contract with the club for another season.

Honours

Club
Pacific FC
Canadian Premier League: 2021

References

External links

2001 births
Living people
Association football midfielders
Canadian soccer players
Soccer players from Victoria, British Columbia
Victoria Highlanders players
Pacific FC players
Pacific Coast Soccer League players
USL League Two players
Canadian Premier League players